Tariqilabeo bicornis, the bihorned barbel, is a species of fish in the family Cyprinidae. This fish reaches up to 15 or 16 centimeters in length. It is found in the upper Salween River in Yunnan, Thailand and Myanmar.

References

Cyprinid fish of Asia
Fish of Myanmar
Freshwater fish of China
Fish of Thailand
Taxa named by Wu Hsien-Wen
Fish described in 1977
Labeoninae